Ashley Lane may refer to:
Ashley Lane (boxer) (born 1990), British boxer
 Ashley Lane (Hendon), nature reserve in London
 Madison Rayne, American professional wrestler formerly known as Ashley Lane